PB&J Otter is an American animated musical television series. It premiered on Disney Channel's preschool block (Playhouse Disney) on March 15, 1998. A total of 65 episodes were produced during the course of its three-season run, with the final episode airing on October 15, 2000. The series centers on the Otter family who live in the rural fishing community of Lake Hoohaw. Most stories revolve around the three Otter kids: older brother Peanut, younger sister Jelly and baby sister Butter (named after the peanut butter and jelly sandwich), as well as their friends and neighbors.

The show was created by Jim Jinkins, who also created Doug and Allegra's Window, and executive-produced by David Campbell in close conjunction with Harvard University's Cognitive Skills Group, "Project Zero". The group's job was to monitor each and make sure the material had a positive educational message. This show features songs by Dan Sawyer, Fred Newman and Rich Mendoza.

PB&J Otter was nominated for an Annie Award for outstanding music in an animated show in 2000.

Episodes

Characters

Main
Peanut Otter (voiced by Adam Rose) is the eldest child  of the family and the group's other leader.
Baby Butter Otter (voiced by Gina Marie Tortorici) is the baby sister and the youngest of the family.
Jelly Otter (voiced by Jenell Slack-Wilson) is the middle child of the family and leader of the group.
Opal Otter (voiced by Gwen Shepherd) is PB&J's mother.
Ernest Otter (voiced by Chris Phillips) is PB&J's father and Opal’s husband.
 Pinch Raccoon (voiced by Cody Pennes) is a blue raccoon.
Scootch Raccoon (also voiced by Cody Pennes) is Pinch's little brother.
Munchy Beaver (voiced by Chris Phillips) is a beaver.
Flick Duck (voiced by Eddie Korbich) is a duck.
Ootsie and Bootsie Snootie (also voiced by Eddie Korbich) are fraternal twin poodles.
Mayor Jeff (voiced by Bruce Bayley Johnson) is an otter and the mayor of Lake Hoohaw.
Cap'n Crane (voiced by Chris Phillips) is a "watchbird".
Connie Crane (voiced by Jackie Hoffman) is Cap'n Crane's wife.

Supporting
Anna "Aunt Nanner" Otter (voiced by Nancy Giles) is Opal's sister, Ernest’s sister-in-law and PB&J’s aunt.
Wanda Raccoon (voiced by Corinne Orr) is Pinch and Scootch's mother and Walter’s wife.
Walter Raccoon (Voiced by Chris Phillips) is Pinch and Scootch's father and Wanda's husband.
Shirley Duck (voiced by Corinne Orr) is Flick's mother.
Betty-Lou Beaver (voiced by Corinne Orr) is Munchy's mother.
Edouard Snootie (voiced by Eddie Korbich) is Ootsie and Bootsie's father, and the wealthiest man in Lake Hoohaw.
Georgina Snootie (voiced by Corinne Orr) is Ootsie and Bootsie's mother.
Bubbles (voiced by Chris Phillips) is the Otters' pet bass.
Redolfo (voiced by Doug Preis) is a handsome, muscular otter who Aunt Nanner befriended.
Billy Duck is Flick's older cousin.
Ricky Raccoon is Pinch's and Scootch's cousin.
Simon Fieldmouse is a little field mouse.
Captain Camel is a camel who sold his store-boat to Ernest and taught him how to run it all by himself.
The Muskrat Family are a family including Mr. and Mrs. Muskrat, Delores Muskrat, Willy Muskrat, and three triplet babies.
The Mole Family are a family including Mr. and Mrs. Mole, Edward Mole, Molly Mole and Nosey Mole.

References

External links
  - Disney Channel United Kingdom
 
 

1990s American animated television series
2000s American animated television series
1998 American television series debuts
2000 American television series endings
American children's animated comedy television series
American children's animated musical television series
American preschool education television series
Animated preschool education television series
1990s preschool education television series
2000s preschool education television series
Fictional otters
Animated television series about mammals
Animated television series about children
Animated television series about families
Animated television series about siblings
Disney Channel original programming
English-language television shows
Television series by Disney Television Animation
Disney Junior original programming
Television series created by Jim Jinkins